Johnny Globe was an outstanding New Zealand bred Standardbred pacer that held four world records. He is notable in that he won the NZ Trotting Cup, the richest harness race, and sometimes the richest horse race in New Zealand. Johnny Globe is also notable in winning 15 free for all pacing events, which at the time was a record. He was also a leading New Zealand sire on four occasions.

Johnny Globe was by Logan Derby, who was very successful harness racer in Australia. His dam, Sandfast, was by Sandydale (USA) from the American pacing mare Slapfast, a yearling record-holder in the States in her day, and who was imported to the New Zealand by Sir John McKenzie. Don Nyhan purchased Johnny Globe from the horse's breeder, Mr F E Ward as a small 10-month-old foal for £50 for his wife, Doris. Nyhan had trained his dam Sandfast for Ward, and knew she had ability after a time trial over a mile in 2.10 at Hutt Park as a two-year-old.

Racing record
As a four-year-old in the 1951/52 season Johnny Globe, was the leading stake-winner with £9,360 and was a close second between Van Dieman and Young Charles in the New Zealand Cup.

Johnny Globe won the following major races:

 1950 Great Northern Derby
 1950 New Zealand Trotting Derby
 1954 New Zealand Trotting Cup from a 48 yards handicap in 4.07 3/5, which was a world record.

He held world records for a mile against the clock on the grass at Epsom in 1:59.8; a mile from a standing start in a race in 2:01.2, and 11 furlongs in a race in 2:50.2. Johnny Globe also holds the New Zealand 1¼ mile record for a three-year-old, in 2:37.6.

Johnny Globe possessed such a great temperament that even as an older stallion he permitted children to ride him bareback and happily accepted Doris bathing his troublesome hooves.

Stud record
He was retired to stand at Globe Lodge, but received poor patronage owing to a bias against New Zealand-bred stallions.  In the first year he had 10 mares booked to him and managed to sire Lordship, who won 45 races including the NZ Cup and was a good sire.

Johnny Globe was also a leading New Zealand sire on four occasions from 1970 to 1973. He was the sire of: 142 New Zealand bred winners, 99 pacers (6 in 2.00), 45 trotters (includes totals of N.Z. wins and N.Z. stake money)

Honours
He was an inaugural inductee into the New Zealand Trotting Hall of Fame along with the immortals Caduceus, Cardigan Bay, Harold Logan, Highland Fling and Ordeal.

See also
 Harness racing in New Zealand

Reference list

External links
 Johnny Globe
Harnesslink

Harness racing in New Zealand
New Zealand standardbred racehorses
New Zealand Trotting Cup winners
New Zealand Trotting Hall of Fame horses
1947 racehorse births
Racehorses bred in New Zealand
Racehorses trained in New Zealand